Oxford–City of Sheridan station (sometimes styled as Oxford•City of Sheridan) is an island platformed RTD light rail station in Sheridan, Colorado, United States. Operating as part of the D Line, the station was opened on July 14, 2000, and is operated by the Regional Transportation District.

References

RTD light rail stations
Railway stations in the United States opened in 2000
Transportation buildings and structures in Arapahoe County, Colorado
2000 establishments in Colorado